Samodiva may refer to:

 Samodiva (mythology), a woodland fairy in South-Slavic folklore and mythology
 Samodiva (village), a village in Bulgaria
 Samodiva Glacier, an Antarctic glacier